Shahjahanpur Lok Sabha constituency is one of the 80 Lok Sabha (parliamentary) constituencies in Uttar Pradesh state in northern India.

Assembly segments
Presently, Shahjahanpur Lok Sabha constituency comprises six Vidhan Sabha (legislative assembly) segments. These segments are:

Members of Parliament

Election results

See also
 Shahjahanpur district
 List of Constituencies of the Lok Sabha

Notes

Lok Sabha constituencies in Uttar Pradesh
Shahjahanpur district